Matthias Lepiller (born 12 June 1988) is a French footballer who plays as a forward.

Career

Le Havre
He made two appearances for Le Havre AC before joining ACF Fiorentina at age of 18 on free transfer in 2006. He made his Ligue 2 debut against AS Nancy, 3 December 2004.

Fiorentina
In July 2008 he rejected a transfer to Queens Park Rangers on loan. In August was loaned out to Grasshopper-Club Zürich, he turned back on 12 January 2009 to ACF Fiorentina. The French player was then loaned out to K.A.S. Eupen from 2009 to 2011 and subsequently to Verona.

On 16 September 2009, it was announced that Fiorentina was ordered by FIFA to pay Le Havre €600,000 for signing Lepiller in 2006. La viola appealed, but the Court of Arbitration for Sport upheld the decision.

Novara 
On 30 August 2012, Lepiller joined Serie B side Novara Calcio.

Juve Stabia
In summer 2014 he was signed by Juve Stabia. In 2015, after the closure of January transfer window, Lepiller was released.

References

External links

1988 births
Living people
French footballers
French expatriate footballers
Le Havre AC players
ACF Fiorentina players
K.A.S. Eupen players
Grasshopper Club Zürich players
Hellas Verona F.C. players
Novara F.C. players
S.S. Juve Stabia players
Ligue 2 players
Belgian Pro League players
Challenger Pro League players
Swiss Super League players
Serie B players
Serie C players
Expatriate footballers in Italy
Expatriate footballers in Belgium
Expatriate footballers in Switzerland
Association football forwards
Footballers from Le Havre